meta-Chlorophenylpiperazine (mCPP) is a psychoactive drug of the phenylpiperazine class. It was initially developed in the late-1970s and used in scientific research before being sold as a designer drug in the mid-2000s. It has been detected in pills touted as legal alternatives to illicit stimulants in New Zealand and pills sold as "ecstasy" in Europe and the United States.

Despite its advertisement as a recreational substance, mCPP is actually generally considered to be an unpleasant experience and is not desired by drug users. It lacks any reinforcing effects, but has "psychostimulant, anxiety-provoking, and hallucinogenic effects." It is also known to produce dysphoric, depressive, and anxiogenic effects in rodents and humans, and can induce panic attacks in individuals susceptible to them. It also worsens obsessive–compulsive symptoms in people with the disorder.

mCPP is known to induce headaches in humans and has been used for testing potential antimigraine medications. It has potent anorectic effects and has encouraged the development of selective 5-HT2C receptor agonists for the treatment of obesity as well.

Pharmacology

Pharmacodynamics

mCPP possesses significant affinity for the 5-HT1A, 5-HT1B, 5-HT1D, 5-HT2A, 5-HT2B, 5-HT2C, 5-HT3, and 5-HT7 receptors, as well as the SERT. It also has some affinity for α1-adrenergic, α2-adrenergic, H1, I1, and NET. It behaves as an agonist at most serotonin receptors. mCPP has been shown to act not only as a serotonin reuptake inhibitor but as a serotonin releasing agent as well.

mCPP's strongest actions are at the 5-HT2B and 5-HT2C receptors and its discriminative cue is mediated primarily by 5-HT2C. Its negative effects such as anxiety, headaches, and appetite loss are likely mediated by its actions on the 5-HT2C receptor. Other effects of mCPP include nausea, hypoactivity, and penile erection, the latter two the result of increased 5-HT2C activity and the former likely via 5-HT3 stimulation.

In comparison studies, mCPP has approximately 10-fold selectivity for the human 5-HT2C receptor over the human 5-HT2A and 5-HT2B receptors (Ki = 3.4 nM vs. 32.1 and 28.8 nM). It acts as a partial agonist of the human 5-HT2A and 5-HT2C receptors but as an antagonist of the human 5-HT2B receptors.

Pharmacokinetics
mCPP is metabolized via the CYP2D6 isoenzyme by hydroxylation to para-hydroxy-mCPP (p-OH-mCPP) and this plays a major role in its metabolism. The elimination half-life of mCPP is 4 to 14 hours.

mCPP is a metabolite of a variety of other piperazine drugs including trazodone, nefazodone, etoperidone, enpiprazole, mepiprazole, cloperidone, peraclopone, and BRL-15,572. It is formed by dealkylation via CYP3A4. Caution should be exercised in concomitant administration of CYP2D6 inhibitors such as bupropion, fluoxetine, paroxetine, and thioridazine with drugs that produce mCPP as a metabolite as these drugs are known to increase concentrations of the parent molecule (e.g., trazodone) and of mCPP.

Chemistry

Analogues
Analogues of mCPP include:

 1-Benzylpiperazine (BZP)
 1-Methyl-4-benzylpiperazine (MBZP)
 1,4-Dibenzylpiperazine (DBZP)
 3-Trifluoromethylphenylpiperazine (TFMPP)
 3,4-Methylenedioxy-1-benzylpiperazine (MDBZP)
 4-Bromo-2,5-dimethoxy-1-benzylpiperazine (2C-B-BZP)
 4-Fluorophenylpiperazine (pFPP)
 4-Methoxyphenylpiperazine (MeOPP)

Some additional analogues include quipazine, ORG-12962, and 3C-PEP.

Society and culture

Legal status

Belgium
mCPP is illegal in Belgium.

Brazil
mCPP is illegal in Brazil.

Canada
mCPP is not a controlled drug in Canada.

China
As of October 2015 mCPP is a controlled substance in China.

Czech Republic
mCPP is legal in the Czech Republic.

Denmark
mCPP is illegal in Denmark.

Finland
mCPP is illegal in Finland.

Germany
mCPP is illegal in Germany.

Hungary
mCPP is illegal in Hungary since 2012.

Japan
mCPP is illegal in Japan since 2006.

Netherlands
mCPP is legal in the Netherlands.

New Zealand
Based on the recommendation of the EACD, the New Zealand government has passed legislation which placed BZP, along with the other piperazine derivatives TFMPP, mCPP, pFPP, MeOPP and MBZP, into Class C of the New Zealand Misuse of Drugs Act 1975. A ban was intended to come into effect in New Zealand on December 18, 2007, but the law change did not go through until the following year, and the sale of BZP and the other listed piperazines became illegal in New Zealand as of 1 April 2008. An amnesty for possession and usage of these drugs remained until October 2008, at which point they became completely illegal. However, it is important to note that mCPP is legally used for scientific research.

Norway
mCPP is illegal in Norway.

Russia
mCPP is illegal in Russia.

Sweden
mCPP is illegal in Sweden.

Poland
mCPP is illegal in Poland.

United States
mCPP is not scheduled at the federal level in the United States, but it is possible that it could be considered a controlled substance analog of BZP, in which case purchase, sale, or possession could be prosecuted under the Federal Analog Act.

However, "chlorophenylpiperazine" is a Schedule I controlled substance in the state of Florida making it illegal to buy, sell, or possess in this state.

Turkey
mCPP is illegal in Turkey since 20/05/2009.

See also
 Substituted piperazine

References

External links
 

 
5-HT2A antagonists
5-HT2B antagonists
5-HT2C agonists
Alpha-1 blockers
Alpha-2 blockers
Anxiogenics
Designer drugs
Human drug metabolites
Serotonin receptor agonists
Serotonin releasing agents
Stimulants